Crimple railway station served the suburb of Crimple, in the historical county of North Riding of Yorkshire, England, from 1867 to 1869 on the Harrogate–Church Fenton line.

History 
The station was opened in November 1867 by the North Eastern Railway. It was situated south of the Crimple Viaduct. It was also known as Crimple Junction in the Knaresborough Post May timetable. It also had a locomotive shed. It was a very short-lived station, only being open for one year and a half before closing in May 1869. The locomotive shed closed shortly after.

References 

Disused railway stations in North Yorkshire
Former North Eastern Railway (UK) stations
Railway stations in Great Britain opened in 1867
Railway stations in Great Britain closed in 1869
1867 establishments in England
1869 disestablishments in England